Christopher Morley (born 22 September 1973) is a former Wales international rugby league footballer who played in the 1990s and 2000s.

Background
Morley was born in Salford, Lancashire, England.

Playing career

International honours
Chris Morley won caps for Wales while at St. Helens in 1996 against France (interchange/substitute), and England, while at Salford in 1999 against Ireland and Scotland, while at Sheffield Eagles in 2000 against South Africa (interchange/substitute), while at Leigh in the 2000 Rugby League World Cup against Lebanon (interchange/substitute), New Zealand, Papua New Guinea (interchange/substitute) and Australia, while at Oldham in 2001 against England, while at Halifax in 2003 against Russia, and Australia, while at Swinton in 2006 against Scotland, 1996...2006 13(14?)-caps + 4-caps (interchange/substitute) 1(2?)-try 4(8?)-points.

It was later revealed, in his brother, Adrian Morley's autobiography "Moz" that Chris Morley did not actually qualify to represent Wales, he had lied to the then Wales Assistant Coach; Mike Gregory, and that Morley's grandmother was born in a village just outside Swansea when in fact she was born in St. Helens, Lancashire, and therefore he had no Welsh qualification.

Challenge Cup Final appearances
Chris Morley was an interchange/substitute in St. Helens' 32–22 victory over Bradford Bulls in the 1997 Challenge Cup Final during Super League II at Wembley Stadium, London on Saturday 3 May 1997.

Genealogical information
Chris Morley is the older brother of the rugby league footballer; Adrian Morley.

References

External links
Profile at saints.org.uk
The Teams: Wales 
Statistics at wolvesplayers.thisiswarrington.co.uk

1973 births
Living people
English people of Welsh descent
English rugby league players
Halifax R.L.F.C. players
Leigh Leopards players
Oldham R.L.F.C. players
Rugby league players from Salford
Rugby league locks
Rugby league props
Rugby league second-rows
Salford Red Devils players
Sheffield Eagles players
St Helens R.F.C. players
Swinton Lions players
Wales national rugby league team players
Warrington Wolves players